It's Your War Too is a 1944 short documentary film about the American Women's Army Corps and commissioned by the United States Government during World War II. It contains 1 minute of animation by the Walt Disney Studios.

Archive
The Academy Film Archive preserved “It's Your War Too” in 2009. The film is part of the Academy War Film Collection, one of the largest collections of World War II era short films held outside government archives.

References

Bibliography

External links

 

1944 films
American World War II propaganda shorts
American short documentary films
American black-and-white films
Documentary films about women in World War II
1944 documentary films
Black-and-white documentary films
1940s short documentary films
1940s English-language films
1940s American films